Reason in Decline is an album by the American band Archers of Loaf, released in 2022. It was their first album in 24 years. The band supported the album with a North American tour. The first single was "In the Surface Noise".

Production
Eric Bachmann wrote many of the songs during the COVID lockdown. "Screaming Undercover" criticizes capitalism. "Aimee" is a tribute to a longtime relationship.

Critical reception

Pitchfork noted that "longtime fans may balk at how clean this record sounds, how guitars that once seemed to shed sparks as they ground against one another now lock into recognizable harmonies." The Tallahassee Democrat wrote that "Human" "stomps like the Loaf of old, with Bachmann's weathered baritone lifting if out of the mosh pit." The Chicago Reader opined that Reason in Decline feels "like the perfect progression from (and a de facto companion piece to) the matured songwriting on White Trash Heroes." AllMusic deemed the album "a brave, compelling, and surprisingly moving set of songs." Record Collector called it "twin-guitar-squealing, drum-thumping rock."

Track listing

Personnel

Archers of Loaf
 Eric Bachmann
 Matt Gentling
 Eric Johnson
 Mark Price

Additional musicians
 Alan Weatherhead – pedal steel (5), Mellotron (5)

Technical
 Archers of Loaf – production
 Adam McDaniel – production
 Alex Farrar – engineering, mixing, co-production
 Bob Weston – mastering

Art and design
 Daniel Murphy – design
 Kate Fix – band photo

References

Archers of Loaf albums
2022 albums
Merge Records albums